Scioglyptis is a genus of moths in the family Geometridae. It consists of the following species, all of which occur in Australia:
Scioglyptis canescaria, the type species (as Boarmia canescaria Guenée, 1857) 
Scioglyptis chionomera
Scioglyptis heterogyna
Scioglyptis loxographa
Scioglyptis lyciaria
Scioglyptis violescens

References

Boarmiini
Moths of Australia
Geometridae genera